The Immediate Geographic Region of Governador Valadares is one of the 4 immediate geographic regions in the Intermediate Geographic Region of Governador Valadares, one of the 70 immediate geographic regions in the Brazilian state of Minas Gerais and one of the 509 of Brazil, created by the National Institute of Geography and Statistics (IBGE) in 2017.

Municipalities 
It comprises 26 municipalities.

 Alpercata   
 Capitão Andrade  
 Conselheiro Pena   
 Coroaci 
 Divino das Laranjeiras  
 Engenheiro Caldas  
 Fernandes Tourinho 
 Frei Inocêncio 
 Galileia  
 Goiabeira   
 Gonzaga   
 Governador Valadares  
 Itanhomi  
 Jampruca    
 Marilac   
 Mathias Lobato  
 Nacip Raydan    
 Santa Efigênia de Minas  
 São Geraldo da Piedade  
 São Geraldo do Baixio   
 São José da Safira   
 Sardoá  
 Sobrália   
 Tarumirim  
 Tumiritinga    
 Virgolândia

References 

Geography of Minas Gerais